Moelfre Isaf is a 317 m (1,040 ft) hill located to the south of the town of Abergele. There are views towards the Clwydian Range, Snowdonia, and the Isle of Man and the Cumbrian Mountains can be seen on a clear day. Nearby is the small settlement of Moelfre, Conwy.
Almost opposite is the higher hill of Moelfre Uchaf.

External links 
 www.geograph.co.uk : photos of Moelfre Isaf and surrounding area

Mountains and hills of Conwy County Borough